Michael A. Rogers is an author, futurist, and columnist for MSNBC.com. He has also worked with companies including FedEx, Boeing and NBC Universal to Prudential, Dow Corning, American Express and Genentech.

Biography
Rogers graduated from Stanford University in 1972 with a Bachelors in Creative Writing and minor in Physics, with additional training in finance and management at Stanford Business School’s Executive Program.

Media and Technology Career
For ten years Rogers was vice president of The Washington Post Company's new media division, overseeing both the newspaper and its sister publication Newsweek, as well as serving as editor and general manager of Newsweek.com. He began his career as a writer for Rolling Stone. In 1975 he wrote a feature article on the bioethics of the longstanding practice of using Henrietta Lacks cells for scientific research. 

He went on to co-found Outside Magazine.  He then launched Newsweek’s technology column, winning numerous journalism awards, including a National Headliner Award for coverage of Chernobyl and a Distinguished Online Service award from the National Press Club for coverage of 9/11.

He began working with interactive media in 1986, when he developed the storyline for the first Lucasfilm computer game.  In 1993 he produced the world's first CD-ROM newsmagazine for Newsweek, going on to develop areas on Prodigy, America Online and then a series of Internet sites. In 1999 he received a patent for the bimodal spine, a multimedia storytelling technique, and is listed in Who’s Who in Science and Engineering.  In 2007 he was named to the Magazine Industry Digital Hall of Fame, and in 2009 he received the World Technology Network Award for Achievement in Media and Journalism.

Publications

Books
Mindfogger (Novel; Knopf, 1973) 
Do Not Worry About the Bear (Short stories; Knopf, 1977) 
Biohazard (Nonfiction; Knopf, 1979) 
Silicon Valley (Novel; Simon & Schuster, 1983) 
Forbidden Sequence (Novel; Bantam, 1989)

Interactive media
Console
1986: BALLBLAZER; Lucasfilm Games; Atari 2600 (writer) Laserdisc/Macintosh
1989: UPHEAVAL IN CHINA; Newsweek; limited release (producer/managing editor)

Diskette
1990: NOT EXACTLY UNIQUE; Tor Productions; limited release (co-producer/writer)

CD-ROM
1993: UNFINISHED BUSINESS: MENDING THE EARTH; Sony MMCD (producer/managing editor)
1994: Newsweek InterActive Documentary Series; Sony MMCD/Software Toolworks, DOS (Producer/Managing Editor) 
 VOLUME I: UNFINISHED BUSINESS/THE BUSINESS OF BASEBALL
 VOLUME II: BEHIND THE SCREENS/ WHAT AILS US?
 VOLUME III: GLOBOCOP/THE SECRET LIFE OF ANIMALS
1995: DRIVING THE DATA HIGHWAY; Newsweek; Macintosh/Windows (writer-producer), NEW MEDIA AT THE WASHINGTON POST COMPANY; Digital Ink;  Macintosh/Windows (producer)
1996: NEWSWEEK PARENT’S GUIDE TO CHILDREN’S SOFTWARE; Digital Ink; Macintosh/Windows (executive producer/writer/host)

Honors and awards
1974: American Association for the Advancement of Science Distinguished Science Writing
2003: National Press Club Award for Distinguished Contribution to Online Journalism, for coverage of 9-11 on Newsweek.com
2007: Magazine Industry Digital Hall of Fame Inductee
2009: World Technology Network Award for Achievement in Media and Journalism

Employment
 
2006–Present: Principal, Practical Futurist (New York City)

References

External links

 A conversation with Rogers on technology and innovation, ideaconnection.com 
 An article about the future of journalism and the New York Times, Financial Times 
 An interview with Michael Rogers, nytco.com

Futurologists
Living people
Stanford University alumni
Year of birth missing (living people)